The women's 1500 metres event at the 1999 Summer Universiade was held on 8 and 11 July at the Estadio Son Moix in Palma de Mallorca, Spain.

Medalists

Results

Heats

Final

References

Athletics at the 1999 Summer Universiade
1999 in women's athletics
1999